One Vice at a Time is the sixth studio album by the Swiss hard rock band Krokus, released in 1982 on Arista Records. It is notable for the strong influence of Australian hard rock band AC/DC on the songs and production, and was the first album to feature Mark Kohler on rhythm guitar. It includes a cover of  the Guess Who's song "American Woman". The song "Long Stick Goes Boom" is used in the video game Grand Theft Auto: Vice City Stories on the fictional in-game radio station "V-Rock".

Bruce Dickinson, who at the time had just been hired as Iron Maiden's new lead vocalist, provides backing vocals on the track "I'm on the Run". Producer Tony Platt was best known for his prior work as engineer with AC/DC.

UK-based company Rock Candy Records reissued the album on CD in 2014.

The band's live album Long Stick Goes Boom: Live From Da House of Rust took its title from the lead-off song on this release.

Critical reception
At the time of release British press has negatively commented on the musical content of the album, condemning the musicians as copycats of AC/DC. Reviewer Dante Bonutto from Kerrang! magazine wrote in March of 1982: "Krokus's infatuation with AC/DC seems to rule out even a hint of progress. On the evidence One Vice at a Time (and it's true of previous albums, also) the band are less concerned with creating something new than aping a tried, tested and successful formula. With the help of producer Tony Platt, who engineered on Highway to Hell and Back in Black, Krokus create passable facsimile of Angus and Co's distinctively-layered sound. The motivations behind the music and that all-important AC/DC swagger, however, can't be reproduced, a fact that leaves the album sounding two-dimensional and soulless. Music by numbers (largely) predictable and uninspired".

Track listing 
Side one
 "Long Stick Goes Boom" (Chris von Rohr, Fernando von Arb, Marc Storace) - 5:12
 "Bad Boys, Rag Dolls" (von Rohr, von Arb, Storace) - 3:48
 "Playin' the Outlaw" (von Rohr, von Arb, Freddy Steady, Storace) - 4:00
 "To the Top" (von Rohr, von Arb, Storace) - 4:21

Side two
"Down the Drain" (von Rohr, von Arb) - 3:12
 "American Woman" (Burton Cummings, Gary Peterson, Michael James Kale, Randy Bachman) - 3:37 (The Guess Who cover)
 "I'm on the Run" (von Rohr, von Arb, Storace) - 3:43
 "Save Me" (von Rohr, von Arb, Steady, Storace) - 4:27
 "Rock 'n' Roll" (von Rohr, von Arb) - 4:07

Personnel
Krokus
 Marc Storace – lead vocals
 Fernando von Arb – lead and rhythm guitar, bass, piano
 Mark Kohler – rhythm and lead guitar, bass
 Chris von Rohr – bass, piano, percussion, drums
 Freddy Steady – drums, percussion

Additional musicians
 Bruce Dickinson – backing vocals on the track "I'm on the Run"

Production
 Tony Platt – producer, engineer, mixing
 Barry Sage – assistant engineer

Charts

Album

Singles

Certifications

References

Krokus (band) albums
1982 albums
Albums produced by Tony Platt
Arista Records albums